John Cooper was Archdeacon of Westmorland from 1865 until 1896.

Cooper was educated at Trinity College, Cambridge, graduating B.A. in 1835. He was Vicar of Kendal from 1858  and Canon of Carlisle from 1861 until his death on 25 July 1896.

Notes

Alumni of Trinity College, Cambridge
Archdeacons of Westmorland
1896 deaths